Richard Logan Fitts (born December 17, 1999) is an American professional baseball pitcher in the New York Yankees organization.

Amateur career
Fitts grew up in Helena, Alabama and attended Helena High School. As a senior, he had a 6–5 win–loss record on the mound with a 1.68 earned run average (ERA) and 102 strikeouts in  innings pitched.

Fitts enrolled at Auburn University to play college baseball for the Auburn Tigers. He began seeing more consistent playing time towards the end of his 2019 freshman season and made two appearances in the College World Series, finishing the year with a 5.31 ERA with 47 strikeouts in  innings pitched. Fitts made six appearances as a sophomore in 2020, with a 1–0 record and a 2.77 ERA with 16 strikeouts before the season was cut short due to the coronavirus pandemic. Fitts entered his junior season on the watchlist for the Golden Spikes Award. He finished the season with a 1-3 record, a 5.88 ERA, and 41 strikeouts over  innings. That summer, he played collegiate summer baseball with the Wareham Gatemen of the Cape Cod Baseball League.

Professional career
Fitts was selected by the New York Yankees in the sixth round of the 2021 Major League Baseball draft. He signed with the team and made his professional debut in 2022 with the Tampa Tarpons.

References

External links

Auburn Tigers bio

Living people
1999 births
People from Helena, Alabama
Baseball players from Alabama
Baseball pitchers
Auburn Tigers baseball players
Wareham Gatemen players